Peroxymonosulfuric acid, also known as persulfuric acid, peroxysulfuric acid, or Caro's acid.  In this acid, the S(VI) center adopts its characteristic tetrahedral geometry; the connectivity is indicated by the formula HO–O–S(O)2–OH. It is one of the strongest oxidants known (E0 = +2.51 V) and is highly explosive.

The disulfuric acid, which appears to be more widely used as its alkali metal salts, has the structure HO–S(O)2–O–O–S(O)2–OH.

History
 was first described in 1898 by the German chemist Heinrich Caro, after whom it is named.

Synthesis and production
The laboratory scale preparation of Caro's acid involves the combination of chlorosulfuric acid and hydrogen peroxide:

 +  ⇌  + HCl 

Published patents include more than one reaction for preparation of Caro's acid, usually as an intermediate for the production of potassium monopersulfate (PMPS), a bleaching and oxidizing agent.  One patent for production of Caro's acid for this purpose gives the following reaction:

 +  ⇌   +  

This is the reaction that produces the acid transiently in "piranha solution".

Uses in industry
 has been used for a variety of disinfectant and cleaning applications, e.g., swimming pool treatment and denture cleaning.  Alkali metal salts of  show promise for the delignification of wood. It is also used in laboratories as a last resort in removing organic materials since  can fully oxidize any organic materials.

They are also used as etchants, oxidative desizing agents for textile fabrics, and for decolorizing and deodorizing oils.

Potassium peroxymonosulfate, is the potassium acid salt of peroxymonosulfuric acid. It is widely used as an oxidizing agent.

Hazards
Pure Caro's acid is highly explosive. Explosions have been reported at Brown University and Sun Oil. As with all strong oxidizing agents, peroxysulfuric acid should be kept away from organic compounds such as ethers and ketones because of its ability to peroxidize these compounds, creating highly unstable molecules such as acetone peroxide.

See also
 Peroxydisulfuric acid
 Peroxomonosulfate

References

Hydrogen compounds
Sulfur oxoacids
Liquid explosives
Persulfates
Peroxy acids
Oxidizing agents
Explosive chemicals